Benjamin Crisp (11 May 1808 in London, England – 2 September 1901) was a New Zealand carrier, temperance reformer, and character.

References

1808 births
1901 deaths
New Zealand temperance activists
English emigrants to New Zealand
19th-century New Zealand politicians